Breaking History: A White House Memoir is a 2022 is the political memoir Jared Kushner recounting his service as senior presidential advisor in the Trump administration.

Contents 

In the memoir, Kushner says that he was diagnosed with thyroid cancer in October 2019 and underwent treatment for it during the Trump Administration.

Critical reception

Bibliography

External links

References 

2022 non-fiction books
English-language books
Broadside Books books
Books about the Trump administration
Memoirs